My Wife Jacqueline is a British sitcom that aired on the BBC Television Service in 1952. It starred Leslie Phillips and Joy Shelton as a young married couple. For Phillips it was his first lead in a television serial.

Cast
Leslie Phillips – Tom Bridger
Joy Shelton – Jacqueline Bridger
Anthea Holloway – Margaret

Episodes
My Wife Jacqueline aired on Wednesdays at around 8.30pm. The programme was broadcast live from Lime Grove Studios and believed never to have been recorded.

Reception
In his 2006 autobiography, Hello, Phillips said "The script was as light as a feather, with characters who appeared to live in a social, political and cultural vacuum that made Mrs Dale's Diary look like a profound study of social history." He also said "we were all surprised how this production reached the public."

References

1952 British television series debuts
1952 British television series endings
1950s British sitcoms
BBC television sitcoms
Lost BBC episodes